, also known as Tracing the Gray Summer, is a 2001 Japanese anime drama film by Satoshi Dezaki, a joint production between the Magic Bus and the GoGo Visual Planning which recounts the true story of the Seveso disaster, a chemical incident occurred over the Italian town of Seveso in 1976, which is still considered one of the worst ecological disasters in history.

Plot
Italy, Summer 1976.

Giulia Bianchi, Maria, Enrico, Lucio and Angelo are a group of friends which live and study in the town of Seveso, not far from Milan. Their lives dramatically change on July 10, when during the party for Giulia's birthday one of the reactors of the close ICMESA chemical plant collapses, spreading into the air a massive, menacing cloud that falls over the surrounding area, covering everything under a white and irritating dust.

First news say that the cloud and the subsequent dust were made of trichlorophenol, a substance toxic for plants but almost harmless to animals and humans, so for days Seveso's inhabitants continue with their lives as if nothing ever happened.

Soon however things turn bad when the animals of Seveso begin to die in droves, and many inhabitants, especially among the aged ones, become sick with no apparent reason.

In search for answers, Giulia and her group, supported by the Japanese journalist Shiro Ando, begin their own investigation, and talking both with an ICMESA's worker and a chemistry professor they soon discover a terrible truth: the cloud released over the town was actually made of trichlorophenol for real, but due to the reactor's excessive temperature part of the substance, immediately after the release, has turned into something incredibly more dangerous:  dioxin.

Thanks to Ando and Enrico's father, which is the Mayor of Seveso, they're able to reveal the truth to the inhabitants, and immediately most of Seveso is evacuated in order to save as much persons as possible from dioxin's deadly effects, but it's already too late. Too much time has passed since the initial contamination, and many inhabitants, including Maria, contract chloracne, as much as many other illnesses linked to an excessive exposure to dioxin (kidney failure, liver failure and cancer).

To make matters worse, the scientific community reveals that dioxin is a potential risk for the pregnant women, since it can provoke malformations and mental diseases on the fetuses. For this, the Italian government gives a temporary authorization to the abortion (which was still illegal on Italy in 1976), to spare to many future parents to have a malformed or demented child.

Subsequent investigations conducted by Shiro reveal one more devastating secret: the journalist's work in fact demonstrates that the "La Roche", the corporation that controls the ICMESA, had voluntarily ignored many safety standards to save over the plant's costs, like create a safety tank for the losses or train its workers in deal such menaces. Plus this, Ando finds out that the "La Roche" had been aware of the incident's true dimensions since the beginning, but it decided to keep the secret as long as possible in order to have enough time to destroy every proof of its crimes.

All of these proofs however will not be enough to assure that the "La Roche"'s owners will pay for their guilts, but the corporation's reputation will be publicly destroyed during a press conference by Giulia and her friends, even if this will not be enough to forget Seveso's sufferings.

Sometime later, Anna, Giulia's sister, which had decided to proceed with her pregnancy despite the risks, will give birth to a healthy girl, but at the opposite the old miss. Sonia will prematurely die, killed by dioxin.

External links
 
 

2000s Japanese-language films
Magic Bus (studio)
2001 anime films
Japanese animated films
Environmental films